Walter Allan Williamson (7 May 1907 – 22 July 1965) was an Australian rules footballer who played with Hawthorn in the Victorian Football League (VFL) and West Torrens in the South Australian National Football League (SANFL).

Williamson, who played his football mostly on the ball or in defence, started his career at West Torrens. He won the West Torrens best and fairest award in 1931 and was captain the next two seasons. His stint as captain included their 1933 premiership win, when they defeated Norwood by 23 points in the grand final.

He played at Hawthorn in the 1934 VFL season, a much weaker side which would win only one of the 12 games that he appeared in. Despite only spending a year at the club, Williamson held the position of vice captain.

Back in South Australia, Williamson played with West Torrens for three further seasons. He represented South Australia in four interstate fixtures during his career.

He was one of many footballers who served his country in World War II, primarily serving in Darwin.

In November 1936 he married Dulcie Elizabeth Lill and they lived in Jetty Street, Grange, South Australia. They had no children together.

Wally Williamson died in Hindmarsh on 22 July 1965.

References

1907 births
Australian rules footballers from South Australia
Hawthorn Football Club players
West Torrens Football Club players
Australian military personnel of World War II
1965 deaths